Il Diamante (The Diamond), ZWV 177, is a composition from 1737 by Czech baroque composer Jan Dismas Zelenka.

History

The secular vocal piece was performed as a surprise gift from the Electress Maria Josepha for the wedding feast of the Schwabian baroness Joanna von Stein and the Polish magnate prince Jerzy Ignacy Lubomirski.

The libretto was discovered in 20th century. The title refers to the bride's name (Stein) and to the special jewelry given to her by the electress as a wedding gift. The composition was a great opportunity for Zelenka to excel as other Dresden operatic composers (Johann Adolf Hasse, Giovanni Alberto Ristori) were busy at that time. It is composed in Italian operatic style.

Description

Terra offers Juno a gemstone as a guarantee of a marriage (Dresden). She asks Hymen and Cupid for a help, to bless the couple. After the final chorus, Venus' aria reminds us that only she can perfect fiancés' love.

Parts

 Sinfonia (Allegro, adagio, Minuetto)
 Recitativo "Questa che il sol produce": Soprano, Terra
 Aria "Alla madre degli amori": Soprano, Terra 
 Recitativo "Del gentile tuo dono": Soprano, Giunone
 Aria "Mira come sue candide piume": Soprano, Giunone
 Recitativo "Prima di scioglier il volo": Soprano+Alto+Soprano, Giunone, Imeneo, Amore
 Aria "Coronato di ghirlande": Alto, Imeneo
 Recitativo "Abitro del destino": Soprano, Amore
 Aria "Così per la foresta": Soprano, Amore
 Recitativo "Fido Imeneo, non più dimora": Soprano, Giunone
 Aria "Veder aspetta": Soprano, Giunone
 Recitativo "Gemma tal che in durezza": Alto+Soprano, Imeneo, Amore
 Aria "Di quegli occhi": Alto, Amore
 Recitativo "Tu che al mondo presiedi": Soprano, Terra
 Aria "Del volto della sposa": Soprano, Terra
 Coro "Godete che lice I"
 Recitativo "Dove amore si festeggia": Soprano, Venere 
 Aria "Qui piegate": Soprano, Venere
 Coro "Godete che lice II"

Recordings

 Adam Viktora, Prague Baroque Soloists & Ensemble Inégal. 2009.

See also
 Sub olea pacis et palma virtutis

References

Compositions by Jan Dismas Zelenka
Oratorios
Operas
Italian-language operas
1737 compositions